Merkhav Mugan (lit. protected space), also known as a "miklat" and popularly known as a mammad, is a reinforced security room required in all new buildings by Israeli law. A Merkhav Mugan is deemed preferable to a bomb shelter when the warning time is too short for residents to reach a shelter, which may be located some distance away. It also offers protection against high impact projectiles and chemical weapons.

History

Security rooms are based on a 1951 civil defense law that has undergone several revisions. After Israel was attacked by Scud missiles in the Gulf War, the Israeli Home Front Command established new guidelines for civil defense. In 1992, technical specifications were drawn up for designated protected spaces in family homes. The Merkhav Mugan can withstand blast and shrapnel from conventional weapons, and offers protection against chemical and biological weapons. It has reinforced concrete walls and ceilings, 20–30 cm thick floors, and airtight steel doors and windows.

Types
 Miklat Tzibury (מקלט ציבורי) – lit. public shelter, a partly underground facility, installed in residential areas. They are commonly used for community needs (clubs, education etc). Maintained by the local governance and Home Front. They are located in streets and near public facilities.

 Miklat BeBayit Meshutaf (מקלט בבית משותף) – lit. shelter in a condominium, a facility built into a building which has been declared as a condominium (commonly in a low-rise building) it includes all the facilities that a public shelter has, but is maintained by the building residents.
 Merkhav Mugan Dirati (מרחב מוגן דירתי or ממ"ד) – installed in residential apartments and private houses.

 Merkhav Mugan Komati (מרחב מוגן קומתי or ממ"ק) – common floor space in apartment buildings in which there is no Merkhav Mugan Dirati in every apartment and in other multi-storey buildings (mostly offices and industry).
 Merkhav Mugan Mosadi (מרחב מוגן מוסדי or ממ"מ) – installed in every public structure.

See also
Architecture of Israel

References

Civil defense
Emergency management in Israel